The 2003 Liga de Fútbol Profesional Boliviano season had 12 teams in competition. The Strongest won the championship.

Results

Standings

References
 

Bolivian Primera División seasons
Bolivia
1